A Hoffa fracture is an intra-articular supracondylar distal femoral fracture, characterized by a fracture in the coronal plane.

It is named for Albert Hoffa.

References

External links

Knee injuries